Haimona Patete (1863 – 25 June 1921) was a New Zealand Māori leader and religious founder. Of Māori descent, he identified with the Ngati Koata and Ngati Kuia iwi. He was born on D'Urville Island, Marlborough, New Zealand in about 1863. He founded a religion based in part upon the teachings of Paora Te Potangaroa

References

1863 births
1921 deaths
People from D'Urville Island, New Zealand
New Zealand Māori religious leaders
Ngāti Koata people
Ngāti Kuia people
Founders of new religious movements